Gerrus can refer to:

Gerrus (province), Iran
Gerrus (genus), a genus in the bird of paradise family Paradisaeidae
GER-RUS, the German-Russian Museum Berlin-Karlshorst